Freedom Writers is a hip hop film score for the movie Freedom Writers. The soundtrack is mainly composed of hip hop songs from the early 1990s, but also contains new songs by will.i.am, Mark Isham and Talib Kweli amongst others.

Track listing

Chart positions

Drama film soundtracks
Hip hop soundtracks
2007 soundtrack albums
Mark Isham soundtracks
Hollywood Records soundtracks